NY Waterway (or New York Waterway) is a private transportation company running ferry and bus service in the Port of New York and New Jersey and in the Hudson Valley. The company utilizes public-private partnership with agencies such as the Port Authority of New York and New Jersey, New Jersey Transit, New York City Department of Transportation, and Metropolitan Transportation Authority to provide service and maintain docking facilities.

NY Waterway uses ferry slips at four terminals in Manhattan as well as terminals and slips in Jersey City, Hoboken, Weehawken, and Edgewater, all located along the Hudson River Waterfront Walkway. Commuter peak service is also provided on the Haverstraw–Ossining Ferry, Newburgh–Beacon Ferry, and to the Raritan Bayshore. Excursions and sightseeing trips include those to Yankee Stadium, Gateway National Recreation Area, and Governors Island. The Manhattan to Jersey City route is used as one of the alternatives for connecting the New York and New Jersey segments of the East Coast Greenway hiking and biking trail, the other choice being the George Washington Bridge.

As of November 2019, NY Waterway has a total fleet of 32 vessels.

History

Founding and early years

In 1981 Arthur Edward Imperatore, Sr., a trucking magnate, purchased a  length of the Weehawken, New Jersey waterfront, where the company is based, from the bankrupt Penn Central for $7.5 million, with the plan to redevelop the brownfield site as had others along the west bank of the Hudson River waterfront and to restore ferry service to it. In 1986 he established New York Waterway, with a route across the river between Weehawken Port Imperial and Pier 78 on the West Side of Midtown Manhattan. Three years later, it began operation between Hoboken Terminal and Battery Park City.

During the course of the next decade numerous routes across the Hudson were added. NY Waterway briefly also operated a high-speed ferry from Staten Island to East 34th Street in 1998, but discontinued it due to low ridership. This marked the first time that NY Waterway discontinued a route.

Expansion and near bankruptcy
The September 11, 2001 attacks on the World Trade Center destroyed the PATH terminal located there, greatly reducing cross-Hudson River passenger capacity. The company was well-positioned to take advantage of government investment in ferry service, receiving subsidies and generous agreements to docking at public facilities. NY Waterway service quickly expanded by adding new routes and increasing the frequency of crossings, heavily borrowing to fund the acquisition of additional vessels.

After PATH service was restored ridership significantly declined, the loss of passengers bringing the company, unable to reduce its fixed costs, to brink of bankruptcy. By December 2004, there was deep concern that there would be a total shutdown of ferry service, disrupting the commutes of 30,000 daily riders. The Port Authority, as well as city and state agencies had already contracted the construction of new ferry terminals to be leased to private operators. The shutdown was averted when the new Billybey Ferry Company, which had never before operated ferry services, founded by Manhattan lawyer William B. Wachtel, agreed to take over almost half of NY Waterway's equipment and routes. The remaining service remained under control of the Port Imperial Ferry Corporation, the legal name of the original organization. Other ferry and sightseeing boat operators were displeased that the Port Authority approved the transfer without a transparent bidding process.

In December 2016, the company announced it would reacquire Billybey Ferry and merge ownership back under a single roof.

East River Ferry

In February 2011, NY Waterway was contracted to operate a route calling at slips in Brooklyn and Queens as well as the East River terminals, replacing an earlier peak-only service operated by New York Water Taxi. In June 2011, the NY Waterway-operated East River Ferry line started operations. The route was a 7-stop East River service that ran between East 34th Street and Pier 11, making one intermediate stop in Queens and four in Brooklyn. The fare was $4 per one-way ticket.

Subsidized by the City of New York, the service was originally intended for commuters, but after a few months became popular with weekend users and tourists. It was used by two to six times the number of passengers that the city predicted would ride the ferries. From June to November 2011, the ferry accommodated 2,862 riders on an average weekday, as opposed to a projection of 1,488 riders, and it had 4,500 riders on an average weekend, six times the city's projected ridership; in total, the ferry saw 350,000 riders in that period, over 250% of the initial ridership forecast of 134,000 riders. The route was merged into NYC Ferry on May 1, 2017, coming under the operation of Hornblower Cruises.

Rescue operations

NY Waterway has played a role in a number of rescue and emergency operations. In the immediate aftermath of collapse of the World Trade Center, the company played a major role in the maritime response following the September 11 attacks and the evacuation of passengers who otherwise would have been stranded because of the chaos in the regional transportation network. It is estimated that NY Waterway transported over 150,000 people. The Hudson Riverfront 9/11 Memorial is located near NY Waterway terminal.

The ferry service also brought people across the river during Northeast Blackout of 2003 when service on New Jersey Transit and Port Authority Trans-Hudson trains could not operate. During the 2005 New York City transit strike it provided alternative transportation.

In 2009, the company was instrumental in the rescue of passengers of US Airways Flight 1549, which made an emergency landing on the Hudson River. The firm gained media attention both for its efforts to rescue passengers from airplane and for its hiring of 19-year-old Brittany Catanzaro as captain.  Thanks in a large part to the successful efforts of Captains Vincent Lombardi and Catanzaro, together with their crews, all aboard were rescued.

On April 6, 2012, a NY Waterway ferry rescued the crew of the Katherine G, a tugboat that capsized near Liberty Island. The ferry's captain, Mohamed Gouda, had also commanded one of the ferries that participated in the flight 1549 rescue.

2023 FTA grant 
In 2023, the state of New Jersey received an $11.3 million grant from the Federal Transit Administration for ferries in the state. As a part of this grant, NY Waterway was given $7.298 million to convert four ferries from diesel to hybrid power.

Controversies

9/11 fraud settlement
In 2003 the US began investigating NY Waterways in allegations that the region's leading private ferry company defrauded the federal government of hundreds of thousands of dollars in the aftermath of the Sept. 11 attack. The United States attorney and the inspector general were trying to determine whether New York Waterway submitted invoices enabling the company to be paid twice for the same expenses and whether it overcharged for other items. In July 2006 NY Waterway agreed to pay $1.2 million to settle civil fraud charges brought by the United States in connection with payments made by the government to NY Waterway for ferry service after the September 11, 2001 attacks. The Government alleged in its complaint that NY Waterway inflated its incremental costs, overstated its ferry service profit margin, and submitted false bills to the Port Authority to gain reimbursement for charter boat expenses that NY waterway, in fact, did not incur.

Homeport controversy
The "home port" for maintenance and refueling has long been located at Weehawken Port Imperial. NY Waterway sold the upland property and in November 2017 purchased former Union Dry Dock  site in Hoboken to build a new facility. The city and the company are embroiled in a dispute over its construction. The city has refused to grant permission to allow the project to proceed saying that it prevents completion of the a contiguous waterfront walkway. A plan for NJ Transit to purchase the property and lease it to NY Waterway was withdrawn after intervention by Governor Phil Murphy NY Waterway is suing the city to allow it to continue with construction. NY Waterway and city reached a deal in which the ferry company would sell the land to the municipality for about $18.5 million, but the sale as of November 2022 had not been finalized.

It was then suggested the homeport in Weehawken would instead be expanded. In January 2022, the municipality passed a resolution opposing the expansion of what has long been a temporary facility. The property in Hoboken again become controversial with proposals to acquire it via eminent domain. In February 2023 the city signed 5-year lease with NY Waterway to continue using the property.

Safety issues
On November 24, 2019, the U.S. Coast Guard pulled 23 ferries out of the company's 32-vessel fleet due to safety issues following a routine annual inspection. Customers experienced delays the following day, but all but one vessel had resumed service by the evening of November 25.

Alleged violations of the Clean Water Act
Two former employees alleged in November 2020 that the company ordered employees to dump untreated sewage into the Hudson.

NJ Transit fare-sharing
Passengers who purchase a 10-trip or a Monthly Joint Bus-Ferry pass take the bus to the Port Authority Bus Terminal during mornings and travel by ferry in the evening.
In December 2014 it was announced that NJT will buy ten buses for NY Waterway's use on its Manhattan bus routes. In January 2016, NY Waterway and NJT introduced the Hudson GoPass, allowing for unlimited use on light rail, ferry and bus routes 156, 158, 159. NJ Transit has also provided funding for boat maintenance and bus purchases.

Routes and terminals

New Jersey—Manhattan services 
Manhattan services originate across four localities in New Jersey: Edgewater in Bergen County, and Weehawken, Hoboken, and Jersey City in Hudson County. These localities are listed below from north to south.

Intra-NYC services

Upstream Hudson services

The Haverstraw–Ossining Ferry connects Haverstraw in Rockland County with Ossining in Westchester County. The Ossining terminal is located adjacent to Ossining station, which is served by Metro-North's Hudson Line. The Newburgh–Beacon Ferry connects Newburgh in Orange County with Beacon in Dutchess County. The Beacon terminal is located adjacent to Beacon station, also served by the Hudson Line. Both ferries are operated under contract from the Metropolitan Transportation Authority.

Manhattan connecting buses

NY Waterway operates connecting bus service for ferry passengers on different routes in Manhattan.

Discontinued services
At various points in the past, NY Waterway has also provided ferry service to other destinations including LaGuardia Airport, Newport, Harborside, Liberty State Park, Port Liberté, Belford, Sandy Hook, and Belmar, New Jersey.

See also
Circle Line Downtown
Circle Line Sightseeing
Ellis Island and Liberty Island ferries
Governors Island Ferry
Liberty Water Taxi
New York Water Taxi
SeaStreak
Staten Island Ferry
List of ferries across the Hudson River to New York City
List of ferries across the East River

References

External links

 

Transport companies established in 1986
Ferries of New Jersey
Ferries of New York City
Ferry companies of New Jersey
Ferry companies of New York City
Tourism in New Jersey
Tourism in New York City
Travel and holiday companies of the United States
Water transportation in New York City
Transportation in Hudson County, New Jersey
Transportation in Manhattan
Companies based in Hudson County, New Jersey
Port of New York and New Jersey
Tourist attractions in Hudson County, New Jersey
Crossings of the Hudson River
1986 establishments in the United States
1986 establishments in New Jersey
1986 establishments in New York (state)